Mitrastigma was a monotypic genus of flowering plants in the family Rubiaceae but is no longer recognized. It was originally described by William Henry Harvey in 1842. The genus was monotypic, containing only the one species Mitrastigma lucidum. It was sunk into synonymy with the genus Psydrax, where Mitrastigma lucidum now appears as the species Psydrax obovata (Klotzsch ex Eckl. & Zeyh.) Bridson.

References

External links 
 World Checklist of Rubiaceae

Monotypic Rubiaceae genera
Historically recognized Rubiaceae genera
Vanguerieae